Sarıalan can refer to:

 Sarıalan, Amasya
 Sarıalan, Kurşunlu
 Sarıalan, Osmancık
 Sarıalan, Vezirköprü